The Andamooka Opal is a famous opal which was presented to Queen Elizabeth II in 1954 on the occasion of her first visit to South Australia. The opal was mined in Andamooka in 1949. It displays a magnificent array of reds, blues, and greens and was set with diamonds into an 18 karat (75%) palladium necklet.

See also 
 List of individual gemstones

Other notable individual opals:
 Galaxy Opal
 Glorious Jubilee
 Flame Queen Opal
 Halley's Comet Opal
 Olympic Australis Opal

References 

Individual opals